Torsak Pongsupa (born 23 November 1968), also known as Torsak Sasiprapa, is a retired Thai professional boxer who held of the WBF Junior featherweight World Champion in late 1990s.

Biography and career
Pongsupa (nickname: Singha; สิงห์) was born at Bangkok's Lat Phrao neighbourhood, Tambon Bang Kapi, Phaya Thai District (currently Bang Kapi District). His father, Capt. Chanai Pongsupa, owns a boxing and Muay Thai gym "Sasiprapa" and was a coach include manager of Thailand national amateur boxing team in the 1980s. He graduated high school from Bangkapi School and received a bachelor's degree from Bangkok University.

He participated in amateur boxing and was quite successful in the youth division. He later qualified for the national team in the 1988 Summer Olympics in Seoul, South Korea. He was defeated by Vichai Khadpo (Vichairachanon Khadpo) by RSC (because his eyebrows were bleeding and couldn't continue to fight). After this he switched to professional boxing. He won seven time, losing only once against fellow-countryman Thanomsak Sithbaobay, and winning WBC Super flyweight International Champion by wins over Dadoy Andujar, a Filipino boxer. He defended his title three times, the first to beat Michael Ebo Danquah, a Ghanaian boxer, at Thai Army Sports Stadium, Vibhavadi Rangsit Road, Din Daeng District, Bangkok.

On December 22, 1991, Pongsupa challenge WBC Super flyweight World Champion against Moon Sung-kil, a Korean holder at Indoor Gymnasium, Incheon, South Korea. But it appears that he was TKO (referee stopped contest) in the sixth round.

He told the background the bout in South Korea, he was taken advantage of, for example, the organizer puts him in a wide gym with only one heater in the cold with Ricardo López, who fights on the undercard, or when Sung-kil weighed himself and found that probably over 115 pounds, but the supervisor allowed it to pass, etc.

After this, he quit boxing. He worked at Osotspa Company as a public relations officer for many years, and then he came back to boxing again with Orathai Kanchanachoosak as a manager and promoter. On 11 May 1996 he challenge the minor institution WBF Junior featherweight with Tony Wehbee, an Australian owner at Ratchawong Pier, Yaowarat, Bangkok, he was the winner by majority points decision.

Pongsupa defended his title twice and eventually retired. After retirement, he became a trainer for Sasiprapa Gym, his own family business.

References

External links
 

1968 births
Living people
Super-flyweight boxers
Super-bantamweight boxers
Boxing trainers
Torsak Pongsupa
Torsak Pongsupa
Southpaw boxers